The 1972–73 World Hockey Association All-Star Game was held in the Le Colisée in Quebec City, home of the Quebec Nordiques, on January 6, 1973. The East All-Stars defeated the West All-Stars 5–2. Wayne Carleton was named the game's most valuable player.

Team Lineups

Game summary 

Goaltenders : 
 East: Smith (30 minutes, 1 goal against), Cheevers (30 minutes, 1 goal against).
 West: Wakely (20 minutes, 1 goal against), Norris (20 minutes, 3 goals against), Curran (20 minutes, 2 goals against).

Shots on goal : 
 East (47) 18 - 14 - 15
 West (33)  8 - 13 - 12

Referee : Bill Friday

Linesmen : Pierre Belanger, Ron Asselstine

Source:

See also
1972–73 WHA season

References

WHA All-Star Game
All
Ice hockey in Quebec City
Sports competitions in Quebec City
1970s in Quebec City